Mário Jorge Malico Paulino (born 10 November 1986), known as Camora, is a professional footballer who plays for and captains Liga I club CFR Cluj as a left-back.

He spent most of his professional career at CFR Cluj in Romania, with which he won nine domestic trophies since signing in 2011. Previously, he totalled 66 matches in the Primeira Liga over four seasons, 64 of those with Naval.

Born in Portugal, Camora acquired Romanian citizenship in 2020 and began representing the national team later that year.

Club career

Portugal
Camora was born in Samora Correia, Benavente, Santarém District. After beginning in amateur football, in January 2006 he signed with S.C. Beira-Mar in the second division. He appeared rarely for the Aveiro-based team in his first years, also being loaned once; in the 2006–07 season he played two games with them in the Primeira Liga, eventually suffering relegation.

In summer 2008, Camora joined Associação Naval 1º de Maio of the top level, making his official debut for the club in the competition on 15 February 2009 by featuring 27 minutes in a 2–2 away draw against C.D. Trofense. After only eight appearances in his first year, he went on to become an important first-team unit at the Figueira da Foz side.

CFR Cluj
On 24 May 2011, following Naval's relegation, Camora moved abroad to Romania's CFR Cluj, where he joined several compatriots. He contributed one goal from 28 appearances in his debut campaign, as the club won the third Liga I championship in its history.

Camora became the player with the most league appearances for CFR on 17 April 2018, after surpassing Cadú's record of 202 matches. On 24 January 2019, it was announced that the captain had agreed to a three-year contract extension, at the same time expressing his desire to retire at the Stadionul Dr. Constantin Rădulescu and move permanently to Romania.

International career
Camora earned his first cap for Romania on 8 October 2020, playing the entire 2–1 away loss to Iceland in the UEFA Euro 2020 qualifiers. In doing so, he reportedly became the oldest footballer to make his debut for the national team at the age of 33 years, 10 months and 28 days.

Personal life
Camora married a Romanian woman, with the couple having one son. On 24 August 2020, he obtained Romanian citizenship and became eligible to represent the national team.

Career statistics

Club

International

Honours

Beira-Mar
Segunda Liga: 2005–06

CFR Cluj
Liga I: 2011–12, 2017–18, 2018–19, 2019–20, 2020–21, 2021–22
Cupa României: 2015–16
Supercupa României: 2018, 2020

Individual
Liga I Team of the Season: 2018–19

Records
Foreign player with the most appearances in Liga I: 358

References
Notes

Citations

External links

1986 births
Living people
People from Benavente, Portugal
Portuguese emigrants to Romania
Naturalised citizens of Romania
Sportspeople from Santarém District
Portuguese footballers
Romanian footballers
Association football defenders
Association football midfielders
Primeira Liga players
Liga Portugal 2 players
Segunda Divisão players
S.C. Beira-Mar players
FC Pampilhosa players
Associação Naval 1º de Maio players
Liga I players
CFR Cluj players
Romania international footballers
Portuguese expatriate footballers
Expatriate footballers in Romania
Portuguese expatriate sportspeople in Romania
A.A. Avanca players